Lake Paucarcocha (possibly from Quechua pawqar multi-coloured, qucha lake, lagoon, "multi-coloured lake") is a lake in Peru located in the Lima Region, Yauyos Province, Tanta District. It has a catchment area of 213.6 km2. Lake Paucarcocha lies south of the Pariacaca mountain range, between P'itiqucha in the northwest and  Piscococha and Chuspicocha in the southeast. Moreover, the lake is located inside the valley of the Cañete River, being this river its primary inflow and outflow source.

The archaeological site of Pirca Pirca is situated north of the lake.

See also
 Cuchi Machay
 List of lakes in Peru
 Nor Yauyos-Cochas Landscape Reserve

References

Paucarcocha
Paucarcocha